Peter Allen "Pete" Pirsch (born October 28, 1969) is a politician from the state of Nebraska in the Midwestern United States. He was born in Omaha, Nebraska. His mother, Carol McBride Pirsch, was a member of the Nebraska Legislature, representing the 10th district from 1979 to 1997. He is a graduate of the University of Virginia (BA in government), the University of Nebraska College of Law (JD), and the University of Nebraska at Omaha (MBA). His professional experience included working as the vice president of PBC, Inc., and as a criminal prosecutor in the city of Omaha.

In a contested primary in 2006, he finished first among four candidates in his initial race for the Nebraska Legislature. He then served two terms in the nonpartisan legislature, representing Nebraska's 4th legislative district, which includes West Omaha. He sat on the Banking, Commerce and Insurance committee and the Revenue committee.

Nebraska's term-limits law precluded Pirsch from running for re-election in 2014. In October 2013, he announced that he would run for Nebraska State Auditor, but after Nebraska Attorney General Jon Bruning announced that he was running for governor, Pirsch decided to run instead for Nebraska Attorney General in the 2014 election. However, he lost in the primaries to Doug Peterson. He is currently serving as an assistant Sarpy County attorney.

References

External links
 
 Biography at Ballotpedia
 Financial information (state office) at the National Institute for Money in State Politics

1969 births
Living people
Republican Party Nebraska state senators
Politicians from Omaha, Nebraska
University of Nebraska alumni
University of Nebraska Omaha alumni
University of Virginia alumni
Omaha Central High School alumni